The following lists events that happened during 1938 in New Zealand.

Population
 Estimated population as of 31 December: 1,618,500
 Increase since 31 December 1937: 16,500 (1.03%)
 Males per 100 females: 103.2

Incumbents

Regal and viceregal
Head of State – George VI
Governor-General – The Viscount Galway GCMG DSO OBE PC

Government
The 25th New Zealand Parliament continues with the Labour Party in government. The general election in October results in the Labour government being returned for the 26th New Zealand Parliament.

Speaker of the House – Bill Barnard (Labour Party)
Prime Minister – Michael Joseph Savage
Minister of Finance – Walter Nash
Minister of Foreign Affairs – Michael Joseph Savage
Attorney-General – Rex Mason
Chief Justice – Sir Michael Myers

Parliamentary opposition 
 Leader of the Opposition –  Adam Hamilton (National Party).

Main centre leaders
Mayor of Auckland – Ernest Davis
Mayor of Wellington – Thomas Hislop
Mayor of Christchurch – John Beanland then Robert M. Macfarlane
Mayor of Dunedin – Edwin Thomas Cox then Andrew Henson Allen

Events 
 19 February: 21 people working on the Wairoa-Gisborne railway are drowned when a flash flood hits a works camp at Kopuawhara near Mahia.
The Times, formerly The Gisborne Times, is purchased by its opposition, The Poverty Bay Herald, which the following year becomes The Gisborne Herald.

Arts and literature

See 1938 in art, 1938 in literature, :Category:1938 books

Music

See: 1938 in music

Radio

See: Public broadcasting in New Zealand

Film
New Zealand Review no.5, Mountain Holiday, 
See: :Category:1938 film awards, 1938 in film, List of New Zealand feature films, Cinema of New Zealand, :Category:1938 films

Sport

Basketball
An interprovincial championship is held even though there is no national association at this time.
Interpovincial Champions – Men: Otago

British Empire Games

Chess
 The 47th National Chess Championship was held in Dunedin, and was won by S. Hindin of Christchurch.

Golf
 The 28th New Zealand Open championship was won by A.D. Locke.
 The 42nd National Amateur Championships were held in Otago
 Men: JP.G.F. Smith (Akarana)
 Women – matchplay: Miss S. Collins
 Women – strokeplay: Mrs R. Fullerton-Smith

Horse racing

Harness racing
 New Zealand Trotting Cup – Morello
 Auckland Trotting Cup –Navy Blue

Lawn bowls
The national outdoor lawn bowls championships are held in Dunedin.
 Men's singles champion – W.D. Bennett (Hastings Bowling Club)
 Men's pair champions – R.B. Clarke, C.E. Tyrrell (skip) (Roslyn Bowling Club)
 Men's fours champions – Stanley Snedden, F. Redpath, P. Munn, H. Wilson (skip) (Linwood Bowling Club)

Rugby
:Category:Rugby union in New Zealand, :Category:All Blacks
 Ranfurly Shield

Rugby league
New Zealand national rugby league team

Soccer
 The Chatham Cup is won by Waterside who beat Mosgiel 4–0 in the final.
 Provincial league champions:
	Auckland:	North Shore United
	Canterbury:	Nomads United
	Hawke's Bay:	Napier United
	Nelson:	YMCA
	Otago:	Mosgiel
	South Canterbury:	Northern
	Southland:	Invercargill Thistle
	Taranaki:	Waitara
	Waikato:	Hamilton Wanderers
	Wanganui:	Marist
	Wellington:	Waterside Karori

Births

 21 January: Jim Anderton, politician. (died 2018).
 11 February: Bevan Congdon, cricketer. (died 2018).
 24 February: Murray Hudson, soldier, winner of the George Cross. (died 1974).
 26 May: Pauline Parker, convicted murderer.
 11 July: Ron Sang, architect and art collector. (died 2021).
 12 July: Stanley Meads, rugby player.
 24 July: John Sparling, cricketer.
 29 July: Millie Khan, lawn bowler. (died 2003).
 28 August: Aroha Reriti-Crofts, politician and community activist. (died 2022).
 10 September: Colin Beyer, lawyer and businessman. (died 2015).
 11 October: William Taylor, children's writer and politician. (died 2015).
 12 October: Geoff Murphy, film director (died 2018).
 28 October (in England): Anne Perry, convicted murderer.
 29 October: Douglas Myers, businessman. (died 2017).
 15 November: Peter Sinclair, radio and television host. (died 2001).
 24 November: Wynne Bradburn, cricketer. (died 2008).
 1 December: Bill Playle, cricketer. (died 2019).
 2 December, Jonathan Hunt, politician and diplomat.
 17 December: Peter Snell, athlete. (died 2019).
 18 December: Syd Jackson, political activist. (died 2007).

Deaths
 10 February: Sir Frederic Truby King, director of child welfare. (b. 1858)
 22 February: Lindsay Buick, historian, journalist, politician. (b. 1865)
 1 April: William Blomfield, cartoonist. (b. 1866)
 12 July: Isabella Foster Rogers Kells, teacher, postmistress and community leader (b. 1861)
 30 July: Alfred Brandon, Mayor of Wellington. (b. 1854)
 15 December: James Whyte Kelly, politician. (b. 1855)

Full date unknown
 Eria Tutara-Kauika Raukura, tribal tohunga. (b. 1834)

See also
History of New Zealand
List of years in New Zealand
Military history of New Zealand
Timeline of New Zealand history
Timeline of New Zealand's links with Antarctica
Timeline of the New Zealand environment

References

External links

 
Years of the 20th century in New Zealand